Tupe can refer to:

 Tupe District, Yauyos, Peru
 Tupe (Bora Bora), an island in the Bora Bora Commune
 Transfer of Undertakings (Protection of Employment) Regulations 2006 (TUPE), UK legislation.
 Vitthal Tupe, Indian politician